Molochansk is a city in Tokmak Raion of Zaporizhzhia Oblast, Ukraine. The river Molochna flows through the city. Population: .

History
Molochansk was founded in 1804 by Plautdietsch-speaking Mennonite settlers who were invited by Empress Catherine the Great to settle on the vast steppes of the Tsar's Russian empire. They called the new village "Halbstadt". Mennonites had earlier, in 1789, founded the Chortitza Colony at the invitation of Catherine the Great. It was the successful founding of Chortitza that encouraged expansion into the Molochna River region. By 1850, there were over 50 Mennonite villages south and east of Molochansk/Halbstadt.

Because of hostile national policies toward Mennonites in the 20th century Soviet Union, almost no Mennonites are left in the region. During Soviet rule, a large number of people lost all their possessions, left the country, or were relocated to the remote parts of Kazakhstan.

In 2004, the 200th anniversary of Molochansk/Halbstadt was celebrated with worldwide distinguished guests in attendance. Canada's ambassador to Ukraine was present at this gala event.

Gallery

See also
 Molotschna

References

External links

 The murder of the Jews of Molochansk during World War II, at Yad Vashem website.

1800s establishments in Ukraine
Cities in Zaporizhzhia Oblast
Cities of district significance in Ukraine
Former German settlements in Zaporizhzhia Oblast
Holocaust locations in Ukraine
Populated places established in 1803
Populated places established in the Russian Empire